Canyards Hills is a 64.1 hectare (158.4 acre) biological and geological site of Special Scientific Interest in South Yorkshire. The site was notified in 1990. This site possesses the most impressive examples in England and Wales of 'ridge-and-trough' or 'tumbled ground.' Beneath a 10 m high cliff, the north-facing valley side above Broomhead Reservoir and the hamlet of Wigtwizzle is a chaotic mass of sub-parallel ridges, separated by intervening narrow areas of marshy ground. The site is formed in Upper Carboniferous Millstone Grit and shows the most extreme form and best example of 'tumbled ground', with innumerable small Millstone Grit blocks (controlled by jointing) taking up a large landslip.

See also
List of Sites of Special Scientific Interest in South Yorkshire

References
 Canyards Hills Natural England. Retrieved on 2009-02-14

Geography of Sheffield
Sites of Special Scientific Interest notified in 1990
Sites of Special Scientific Interest in South Yorkshire